KTNL-TV, virtual and VHF digital channel 7, is a CBS-affiliated television station licensed to Sitka, Alaska, United States. Owned by Ketchikan TV, LLC, it is a translator of KYEX (channel 5) in Juneau and is also a translator of full-time satellite station: KUBD (channel 13) in Ketchikan. KTNL-TV's transmitter is located in downtown Sitka.

In 2014, Ketchikan Television sold KTNL-TV, KUBD and KXLJ-LD to Denali Media Holdings.

At the time it launched in 1966, it was Sitka's second television station behind now-defunct cable NBC affiliate KSA-TV.

Digital television

Digital channel

References 

1966 establishments in Alaska
CBS network affiliates
Sitka, Alaska
Television channels and stations established in 1966
TNL-TV